Maravarman Avanisulamani (IAST: Avaniśūlāmani; r. c. 620–645 CE) was a Pandya ruler of early historic south India. He was the son and successor of Kadungon, who revived the Pandya dynastic power after the Kalabhra interregnum. Not much information is available about either of these kings.

Velvikkudi Grant (a later copper-plate inscription) is the only source information about Avanisulamani.  The grant praises the Pandya, claiming that he removed the common ownership of the Earth (by making it his own) and married the goddess of the flower (Lakshmi). 

Maravarman Avanisulamani was succeeded by his son Seliyan Sendan (Jayantavarman).

Dates 
 K. A. Nilakanta Sastri — c. 620–645 CE. 
 T. V. Sadasiva Pandarathar — c. 600–625 CE.
 Noboru Karashima — c. 590–620 CE

References

Bibliography 
 
 
 
 
 

Pandyan kings
7th-century Indian monarchs
6th-century Indian monarchs